In differential geometry and general relativity, the Bach tensor is a trace-free tensor of rank 2 which is conformally invariant in dimension . Before 1968, it was the only known conformally invariant tensor that is algebraically independent of the Weyl tensor. In abstract indices the Bach tensor is given by

where  is the Weyl tensor, and  the Schouten tensor given in terms of the Ricci tensor  and scalar curvature  by

See also
Cotton tensor
Obstruction tensor

References

Further reading
 Arthur L. Besse, Einstein Manifolds. Springer-Verlag, 2007. See Ch.4, §H "Quadratic Functionals".
 Demetrios Christodoulou, Mathematical Problems of General Relativity I. European Mathematical Society, 2008. Ch.4 §2 "Sketch of the proof of the global stability of Minkowski spacetime".
 Yvonne Choquet-Bruhat, General Relativity and the Einstein Equations. Oxford University Press, 2011. See Ch.XV §5 "Christodoulou-Klainerman theorem" which notes the Bach tensor is the "dual of the Coton tensor which vanishes for conformally flat metrics".
 Thomas W. Baumgarte, Stuart L. Shapiro, Numerical Relativity: Solving Einstein's Equations on the Computer. Cambridge University Press, 2010. See Ch.3.

Tensors
Tensors in general relativity